Pullman Porter Blues is a 2012 play written by Cheryl West. Set in 1937, during the Great Depression, the play shows the story of the Pullman porters on a train ride aboard the Panama Limited from Chicago to New Orleans.

Locations performed
Arena Stage Kreeger Theater in Washington, D.C.
Goodman Theatre in Chicago

Cast
Grandfather Monroe - Larry Marshall
Cephas - Warner Miller or Tosin Morohunfola
Sylvester - Cleavant Derricks
Train conductor Tex
Lutie the stowaway

Music
 Hezekiah’s Song
 This Train
 Sweet Home Chicago
 Wild Women Don't Have the Blues
 Panama Limited Chant
 Panama Limited Blues
 900 Miles
 Joe Louis Blues
 Hop Scop Blues
 That Lonesome Train Took My Baby Away
 Trouble in Mind
 Grievin’ Hearted Blues
 Hezekiah’s Song (Reprise)

Reception
Variety reviewer Paul Harris wrote: "Despite its flaws, "Pullman Porter Blues" offers delightful moments and earns kudos for attitude." The Chicago Readers Justin Hayford was critical of the play's "repetitive scenes," while the Chicago Tribunes Chris Jones found the production to be "a good 15 minutes too long" but was nonetheless entertained.

References

External links
Interview with playwright Cheryl West and actor Larry Marshall on St. Louis Public Radio KWMU-1

2012 plays
American plays
Great Depression plays